Françoise Gisou van der Goot (born 19 September 1964 in Tehran) is a Swiss-Dutch cell biologist. She is a professor and the Vice President for Responsible Transformation at EPFL (École Polytechnique Fédérale de Lausanne).

Career
Gisou van der Goot studied engineering at the École Centrale de Paris. She pursued a PhD in molecular biophysics at the Saclay Nuclear Research Centre (Pierre and Marie Curie University). After her PhD, she was a postdoctoral researcher at the European Molecular Biology Laboratory (EMBL) in Heidelberg. In 1994 she worked as a group leader in the Department of Biochemistry of the University of Geneva and, subsequently, from 2001 as associate professor in the department of microbiology and molecular medicine. Since 2006, she has been full professor of molecular and cellular microbiology at the School of Life Sciences of EPFL, where she was also dean until 2020. In September 2020, she was appointed Vice President for Responsible Transformation at EPFL for a term starting in 2021.

Research
Gisou van der Goot leads the Laboratory of Cell and Membrane Biology at the School of Life Sciences of the École Polytechnique Fédérale de Lausanne (EPFL). Her laboratory studies various aspects of cellular and intracellular membrane dynamics. Notably, it aims to better understand the way protein palmitoylation regulates endoplasmic reticulum function and protein trafficking, the mechanisms which allow bacterial proteins such as the anthrax toxin to penetrate target cells, and the molecular mechanisms leading to juvenile hyaline fibromatosis, a rare and debilitating genetic disorder. In the context of the COVID-19 pandemic, Gisou van der Goot declared to have dedicated part of her laboratory to study SARS-CoV-2.

Awards and honors

Gisou van der Goot obtained a European Molecular Biology Organization (EMBO) Young Investigator award in 2001 and an Howard Hughes International Scholar award in 2005. In 2009, she received the Leenaards Foundation Research Prize and the Marcel Benoist Prize. The latter two prizes were awarded for her contributions to the biochemistry of the bacterial toxin of the anthrax pathogen at the host cell membrane. In 2020, she was awarded the Suffrage Science award.

She has been member of scientific boards such as the Swiss National Science Foundation, the Swiss Science Council and the European Research Council (ERC).

Selected works

Personal life 

Gisou van der Goot is married to Swiss biologist Jean Gruenberg and has two children.

References

External links 

 
 Publication listed on Publons
 Website of the Laboratory of Cell and Membrane Biology

1964 births
Living people
Dutch academics
Dutch women scientists
Academic staff of the École Polytechnique Fédérale de Lausanne
Dutch microbiologists
École Centrale Paris alumni